Bill Yoest (born November 26, 1951) is a former American football offensive lineman who played college football at North Carolina State University and attended North Catholic High School in Pittsburgh, Pennsylvania. He was a consensus All-American in 1973. He also played for the Houston Texans and Florida Blazers of the World Football League (WFL).

Early years
Yoest played high school football at North Catholic High School. He was named in the Pittsburgh Post-Gazette's 1968 All-Catholic team  and named to the third team, Associated Press All-State.

College career
Yoest was a four-year letterman for the NC State Wolfpack from 1970 to 1973. He was a consensus All-American in 1973.  Yoest was a two-time first-team All-ACC selection and won the 1973 ACC Jacobs Blocking Trophy. He was selected to the 1974 Hula Bowl and the East–West Shrine Game, where he was elected co-captain of the East squad. Number 63 was retired in Yoest's honor by the NC State Wolfpack at halftime of the September 27, 2003 game against North Carolina.

Professional career
Yoest spent one season in the WFL with the Houston Texans and the Florida Blazers.

References

External links
Just Sports Stats

Living people
1951 births
Players of American football from Pittsburgh
American football offensive guards
American football offensive tackles
NC State Wolfpack football players
Houston Texans (WFL) players
Florida Blazers players
All-American college football players
Place of birth missing (living people)